Sukkur Express is a daily express train service between Karachi and Jacobabad in Pakistan. The train named after Sukkur, a city  in Sindh, Pakistan. In beginning it was run between Karachi and Sukkur; later its route was extended to Karachi and Jacobabad.

Sukkur Express has Economy, AC lower and AC Sleeper class accommodation. It covers the  distance from Karachi to Jacobabad in 11 hours and 55 minutes.

Route 
Karachi to Jacobabad via Hyderabad and Rohri

Train stops  
 Karachi City
 Karachi Cantt
 Drigh Colony
 Landhi
 Kotri Jn
 Hyderabad Jn
 Tando Adam
 Shahdadpur
 Nawabshah
 Kot Lalloo
 Pad Idan
 Bhiria Road
 Lakha Road
 Mehrabpur
 Setharja 
 Ranipur Riyasat
 Gambat
 Khairpur
 Rohri Jn
 Sukkur
 Shikarpur
 Jacobabad

References 

Named passenger trains of Pakistan
Passenger trains in Pakistan